Jamboree is the second album by jangle pop band Guadalcanal Diary. It was released in 1986 on Elektra Records.

Track listing
"Pray for Rain" – 4:06
"Fear of God" – 3:22
"Jamboree" – 3:17
"Michael Rockefeller" – 4:50
"Spirit Train" – 3:00
"Lonely Street" – 2:37
"Country Club Gun" – 2:26
"T.R.O.U.B.L.E." – 3:17
"I See Moe" – 1:28
"Please Stop Me" – 2:42
"Dead Eyes" – 2:59
"Cattle Prod" – 2:58

References 

Guadalcanal Diary (band) albums
1986 albums
Albums produced by Steve Nye
Elektra Records albums